Capellen Choir is a custom sized studio chorus (80+), utilizing selective singers from the Czech Republic, Slovakia, Austria and Hungary. Formed and exclusively used by Capellen Music Production.

Discography
 Sons of Odin (2006)
 Three Kingdoms: Resurrection of the Dragon (2009)

Filmography
 Three Kingdoms: Resurrection of the Dragon (2009)
 Future X-Cops (2010)
 14 Blades (2010)
 The Tudors (2010)
 The Pillars of the Earth (TV miniseries) (2010)

External links
 

Czech choirs
Musical groups established in 2006
2006 establishments in the Czech Republic